Anza-Borrego Desert State Park (AN-zə bə-RAY-goh) is a California State Park located within the Colorado Desert of southern California, United States. The park takes its name from 18th century Spanish explorer Juan Bautista de Anza and borrego, a Spanish word for sheep. With  that includes one-fifth of San Diego County, it is the largest state park in California.

The park occupies eastern San Diego County and reaches into Imperial and Riverside counties, enveloping two communities: Borrego Springs, which is home to the park's headquarters, and Shelter Valley.

Geography

The park is an anchor in the Mojave and Colorado Deserts Biosphere Reserve, and adjacent to the Santa Rosa and San Jacinto Mountains National Monument.

The great bowl of the surrounding desert is surrounded by mountains, with the Vallecito Mountains to the south and the highest Santa Rosa Mountains to the north which are in the wilderness area, without paved roads and with the only year-round creeks.

Blair Valley is a valley in the State Park.
It consists of the main Blair Valley and Little Blair Valley separated by a small mountain range over which Foot and Walker Pass leads.
To the west of the valley lies Granite Mountain, to the east the range of Vallecito Mountains.

The valley can be crossed by dirt roads, e.g., to reach a look-out point over Smuggler Canyon or sites of Indian pre-Hispanic art.

Borrego Palm Canyon is the site of park headquarters and has “the most famous view point in the park, overlooking barren, spectacularly eroded Borrego Badlands.” Tamarisk Grove hosts a campground and is close to Yaqui Well, a “historic watering spot…with magnificent desert ironwood trees and a busy wildlife population.”

Visiting

Park information and maps are available in the visitor center. The park has Wi-Fi access.

The park is approximately a two-hour drive northeast from San Diego, southeast from Riverside or Irvine, and south from Palm Springs. Access on the east-Coachella Valley side is via County Route S22 and State Route 78. Access on the west-Pacific Ocean side is via California County Route S2 and State Route 78. SR-79 provides access through the high and forested Laguna Mountains, such as in Cuyamaca Rancho State Park. Access from the south is via the southern portion of S2.

A popular site to hike to near the visitor center is Hellhole Palms, a grove of California fan palms in Hellhole Canyon near Maidenhair Falls. The park also provides access points to the Pacific Crest Trail.

Stargazing is another activity at Anza-Borrego. The park was designated a Dark Sky Park by the International Dark-Sky Association in 2018.

Flora and fauna

The habitats are primarily within the Colorado Desert ecosystem of the Sonoran Desert ecoregion. The higher extreme northern and eastern sections in the Peninsular Ranges are in the California montane chaparral and woodlands ecoregion. The park has about 600 species of native plants.

The park contains bajadas and desert washes; rock formations and colorful badlands, large arid landscapes, and mountains. 

The bajadas are predominantly creosote bush-bur sage with creosote bush (Larrea tridentata) and the palo verde-cactus shrub ecosystems with the palo verde tree (Parkinsonia microphylla), cacti, and ocotillo. In the washes, Colorado/Sonoran microphylla woodlands can be found. These woodlands include such plants as smoke tree (Psorothamnus spinosus), velvet mesquite (Prosopis velutina), and catclaw (Acacia greggii). The park is home to elephant trees (Bursera microphylla), which are “fairly common in parts of Baja California but north of the border practically confined to the Anza-Borrego region.”

The park has natural springs and oases, with the state's only native palm, the California fan palm. Seasonal wildflower displays can be seen in many plant community association throughout the park. The high-country to the north and east has closed-cone pine forests, manzanitas and oak woodlands.

The oases are prolific with many types of fauna, especially for bird-watching. Throughout the park, visitors may see bighorn sheep, mountain lions, kit foxes, mule deer, coyotes, greater roadrunners, golden eagles, black-tailed jackrabbits, ground squirrels, kangaroo rats, quail, and prairie falcons. In the reptile class, desert iguanas, chuckwallas, and the red diamond rattlesnakes can be seen.

Desert bighorn sheep
Some areas are habitats for the desert bighorn sheep. Observers count this endangered species to study the population, and monitor its current decline from human encroachment.

Climate
Anza-Borrego State Park has a hot desert climate (BWh) with very hot, dry summers and short, cool winters.

Geology and paleontology

The expanses of Anza-Borrego Desert State Park's eroded badlands also provide a different view into the region's long-vanished tropical past. The inland of southeastern California was not always a desert. Paleontology, the study of the fossilized remains of ancient life, is the key to understanding this prehistoric world. The park has an exceptional fossil record which includes preserved plants, a variety of invertebrate shells, animal tracks, and an array of bones and teeth. Most fossils found in the park date from six million to under a half million years in age (the Pliocene and Pleistocene epochs), or about 60 million years after the last dinosaur age ended.

Geology

Anza-Borrego Desert State Park lies in a unique geologic setting along the western margin of the Salton Trough. The trough extends north from the Gulf of California to San Gorgonio Pass, and from the eastern rim of the Peninsular Ranges eastward to the San Andreas Fault zone along the far side of the Coachella Valley.

Paleontological remains are widespread and diverse, and are found scattered over hundreds of square miles of eroded badlands terrain extending south from the Santa Rosa Mountains into northern Baja California in Mexico.

Both marine and terrestrial environments are represented by this long and rich fossil record. Six million years ago, the ancestral Gulf of California filled the Salton Trough, extending northward past what would become the city of Palm Springs. These tropical waters supported a profusion of both large and small marine organisms. Through time, the sea gave way as an immense volume of sediment eroded during the formation of the Grand Canyon spilled into the Salton Trough. Little by little, the ancestral Colorado River built a massive river delta across the seaway. Fossil hardwoods from the deltaic sands and associated coastal plain deposits suggest the region received three times as much rainfall as now.

The Anza-Borrego region gradually changed from a predominantly marine environment into a system of interrelated terrestrial habitats. North of the Colorado River Delta and intermittently fed by the river, a sequence of lakes and dry lakes has persisted for over three million years. At the same time, sediments eroded from the growing Santa Rosa Mountains and the other Peninsular Ranges to spread east into the trough. These sediments provide an almost unbroken terrestrial fossil record, ending only a half million years ago. Here, the deposits of ancient streams and rivers trapped the remains of wildlife that inhabited a vast brushland savannah laced with riparian woodlands.

Fossils
This record of changing environments and habitats includes over 550 types of fossil plants and animals, ranging from the preserved microscopic plant pollen and algal spores to baleen whale bones and mammoth skeletons. Many of the species are extinct and some are known only from fossil remains recovered from this park. Combined with a long and complete sedimentary depositional sequence, these diverse fossil assemblages are an unparalleled paleontologic resource of international importance.

Both the Pliocene-Pleistocene epoch boundary and the Blancan-Irvingtonian North American land mammal ages boundary fall within the long geological record from the Anza-Borrego region. Environmental changes associated with these geological time divisions are probably better tracked by fossils from the Anza-Borrego region than in any other North American continental platform stratum. These changes herald the beginning of the Ice Ages, and the strata contain fossil clues to the origin and development of modern southwestern desert landscapes.

The first fossils, marine shells from the ancient Gulf of California and freshwater shells from a prehistoric era Lake Cahuilla, the precursor of present-day Salton Sea, were collected and described by William Blake in 1853. Blake was the geologist and mineralogist for the Pacific Railroad Surveys commissioned by Congress and President Franklin Pierce to find a railway route to the Pacific. Blake first named this region the Colorado Desert.

Marine period

Since the late 19th century, numerous scientific studies and published papers have centered on the marine organisms that inhabited the ancient Gulf of California. Fossil assemblages from the classic Imperial Formation include calcareous nanoplankton and dinoflagellates, foraminifera, corals, polychaetes, clams, gastropods, sea urchins, sand dollars, and crabs and shrimp. The deposits also yield the remains of marine vertebrates, such as sharks and rays, bony fish, baleen whales, walruses and dugongs.

Marine environments such as an outer and inner shelf, platform reef, nearshore beach, and lagoon, are all represented within the Imperial Formation. As the sea became more shallow, estuarine and brackish marine conditions prevailed, typified by thick channel deposits of oyster and pecten shell coquina that now form the "Elephant Knees" along Fish Creek. Many of the marine fossils are closely related to forms from the Caribbean Sea. They document a time before the Isthmus of Panama formed when the warm Gulf Stream of the western Atlantic Ocean invaded eastern Pacific Ocean waters.

Terrestrial period
As North and South America connected about three million years ago, terrestrial faunal north-south migrations began on a continental scale called the Great American Interchange, and are present in Anza-Borrego's fossils. Animals such as giant ground sloths and porcupines made their first appearance in North America at this time.

The oldest terrestrial vertebrate fossils from the Colorado Desert predate the late Miocene invasion of the Gulf of California. These very rare fossils include a gomphothere (elephant-like mammal), rodent, felid and small camelid, and were collected from 10– to 12-million-year-old riverine and near-shore lake deposits. However, the most significant and abundant vertebrate fossils have been recovered from the latest Miocene through late-Pleistocene riverine and flood plain deposits of the Palm Spring Formation in the Vallecito and Fish Creek Badlands and Ocotillo Conglomerate exposed in the Borrego Badlands. These fossil assemblages occur in a 3.5-million-year-long, uninterrupted stratigraphic sequence that has been dated using horizons of volcanic ash and paleomagnetic methods.

The bestiary for this savannah landscape includes some of the most unusual creatures to inhabit North America – animals such as:Geochelone, a giant bathtub-sized tortoise; Aiolornis incredibilis, the largest flying bird of the Northern Hemisphere, with 17-ft (5.2-m) wing span; Paramylodon, Megalonyx and Nothrotheriops, giant ground sloths, some with bony armor within their skin; Pewelagus, a very small rabbit; Borophagus, a hyena-like dog; Arctodus, a giant short-faced bear; Smilodon, a saber-toothed cat; Miracinonyx, the North American cheetah; Mammuthus imperator, the largest known mammoth; Tapirus, an extinct tapir; Equus enormis and Equus scotti, two species of extinct Pleistocene horses; Gigantocamelus a giant camel; and Capromeryx minor, the dwarf pronghorn.

Native Americans
The Native Americans of the surrounding mountains and deserts include the Cahuilla, Cupeño, and Kumeyaay (Diegueño) Native American tribes. It was the homeland of these peoples for thousands of years, and their artists created petroglyph and pictogram rock art expressing their cultures.

Park interpretive associations
The Anza-Borrego Foundation, founded in 1967, is a non-profit educational organization and is the sole cooperating association of the park. It manages all sales at the State Park Visitor Center and State Park Store.

The Anza-Borrego Institute, the education arm of the foundation, provides in-depth educational courses to more than 100,000 visitors each year. The institute offers in-depth field programs, a fifth-grade environmental camp, citizen science research, and Parks Online Resources for Teachers and Students. The foundation's mission is to protect and preserve the natural landscapes, wildlife habitat, and cultural heritage of the park for the benefit and enjoyment of present and future generations.

Gallery

See also
 Last Days in the Desert, a 2015 movie filmed in the park
 Mojave and Colorado Deserts Biosphere Reserve
 Man and the Biosphere Programme
 World Network of Biosphere Reserves in the United States
 Mud Caves
 Ocotillo Wells, California
 Shelter Valley, California

References
Specific

 General
 Hogan, C. Michael (2009). California Fan Palm: Washingtonia filifera, GlobalTwitcher.com, ed. Nicklas Stromberg
 Jefferson, George T. and Lowell Lindsay (2006). Fossil Treasures of the Anza-Borrego Desert (Sunbelt Publications, San Diego).

Further reading
 Halford, Robin (2005). Hiking in Anza-Borrego Desert: Over 100 Half-Day Hikes (Anza Borrego Desert Natural History Association, Borrego Springs). 
 
 Lindsay, Diana (2001). Anza-Borrego A to Z: People, Places, and Things (Sunbelt Publications, San Diego). 
 Lindsay, Lowell, and Diana (2006). The Anza-Borrego Desert Region: A Guide to the State Park and Adjacent Areas of the Western Colorado Desert. Fifth Edition (Wilderness Press, Berkeley). 
 Serenity (film) – location shooting in the park for the 2005 feature film shows the environs.
  – Marshal South and his wife, Tanya, wrote a series of highly popular "Desert Refuge" articles (1940–1946) for the Desert Magazine about their primitive life in the desert. They lived in a home they called Yaquitepec on a mountaintop named Ghost Mountain near Blair Dry Lake

External links

 official Anza-Borrego Desert State Park website
 Anza-Borrego Foundation
 Anza-Borrego Desert Natural History Association
 Juan Bautista de Anza National Historic Trail
 Anza Borrego Tribute
 Anza Borrego Hiking
 Fish Creek Wash & Carrizo Badlands
 Borrego Springs Chamber & Visitors' Bureau

Anza-Borrego Desert State Park
State parks of California
Colorado Desert
Nature centers in California
Nature reserves in California
Parks in Imperial County, California
Parks in Riverside County, California
Parks in San Diego County, California
Protected areas of the Colorado Desert
National Natural Landmarks in California
Santa Rosa Mountains (California)
Salton Trough
1933 establishments in California
Protected areas established in 1933
Campgrounds in California
Parks in Southern California